Amata tetragonaria  is a species of moth of the family Erebidae first described by Francis Walker in 1862. It is found on Borneo and the Natuna Islands.

References 

tetragonaria
Moths described in 1862
Moths of Borneo
Moths of Indonesia